Mark Cuban Cost Plus Drug Company (MCCPDC), doing business as Cost Plus Drugs, is a public benefit corporation (PBC) with its main headquarters located in Dallas, Texas. The company is focused on the pharmacy distribution of drugs with a stated goal to lower the prices for generic drugs by removing middlemen and by moving to a cost-plus pricing strategy.

Origins and concept
The company was launched in January 2022. It was co-founded by radiologist Alexander Oshmyansky and Mark Cuban. According to Cuban, in 2018, Oshmyansky contacted Cuban with an email entitled "cold pitch" in which he asked Cuban to invest in a pharmacy he envisioned to manufacture generic drugs and skip the middleman wholesalers. The company claims that the intermediary layer of the pharmacy benefit managers, is typically responsible for the heavy markup that drugs see between the manufacturers and the customers. The company uses Truepill Pharmacy's accredited pharmacists to fill prescriptions. Prices are direct to consumer, without any need or role for insurance.

Operations
As of February 2022, the company is in the process of constructing a  factory in Deep Ellum, Dallas, for the purpose of manufacturing drugs in-house, which is scheduled to open in the 4th Quarter of 2022.

As of June 2022, the company has a selection of over 100 generic drugs. The drugs are sold for a price equivalent to the company's cost plus 15% markup and a $3 pharmacy service fee.  The company currently ships to all 50 US States.

Oshmyansky is currently serving as the CEO.

References

External links 
 

Generic drug manufacturers
Social problems in medicine
2022 establishments in Texas
Companies based in Dallas